Colony Town is a ghost town in Leflore County, Mississippi.

A post office operated under the name Colony Town from 1918 to 1942.

References

Former populated places in Leflore County, Mississippi
Former populated places in Mississippi